The Woman's Art Club of New York was founded in New York City in 1889 and provided a means for social interaction and marketing of women's works of art. The club accepted members from the United States and abroad. In 1913, the group changed its name to the National Association of Women Painters and Sculptors. The current name for the group is the National Association of Women Artists, which was adopted in 1941.

History

The club was founded by the artists Anita C. Ashley, Adele Frances Bedell, Elizabeth S. Cheever, Edith Mitchill Prellwitz, and Grace Fitz-Randolph in Fritz-Randolph's studio on Washington Square in New York on January 31, 1889. The purpose was for "social intercourse among art lovers, for exhibition and to further art interests." More specifically, it aimed to provide a way in which women's works of art could be marketed that were otherwise limited to women at the time.

The group held annual art exhibitions in which members could submit one art work for the exhibition. Any additional works were reviewed by the selection jury. Its members included non-exhibiting and exhibiting members. The Woman's Art Club accepted members and exhibition contributions from women in the United States and abroad. For instance, Mary Cassatt, who lived in Paris, exhibited her works.

In 1892 there were about 300 works of art submitted, including watercolors, oils paintings, etchings, pastels and crayons.

Executive Committee members were elected at its November annual meeting. It was located at 9-Tenth Street.

In 1913, its name was changed to the National Association of Women Painters and Sculptors. It adopted the name National Association of Women Artists in 1941.

Members
Some of its members were:
 Ruth Payne Burgess
 Emma Lampert Cooper
 Louise Cox
 Florence Ballin Cramer
 Jenny Eakin Delony
 Claude Raguet Hirst
 M. Jean McLane
 Rhoda Holmes Nicholls
 Clara Weaver Parrish
 Amanda Brewster Sewell
 Isabelle Sprague Smith
 Clara Welles Lathrop 
 Mary Rogers Williams
 Shirley Williamson, she also served as president

See also
 Women artists

Other turn of the century New York art organizations that exhibited women's work
 MacDowell Club, New York, founded 1905
 New York Watercolor Club, founded 1890

References

American artist groups and collectives
Women's organizations based in the United States
Art in New York City
Arts organizations based in New York City
1890 establishments in New York (state)
Arts organizations established in 1890